Adilson Angel Abreu de Almeida Gomes (born 31 August 2000) is an English professional footballer who plays as a midfielder for Ligue 1 club Lille and the England under-21 national team.

He began his career with Manchester United at the age of six and progressed through the club's academy. When he made his first-team debut in May 2017, he became the youngest player to play for Manchester United since Duncan Edwards in 1953, as well as the first player born in the 2000s to appear in the Premier League. He made 10 appearances across four seasons for the Manchester United first-team, before being released at the end of his contract in 2020. He signed for Lille in August 2020 and was immediately loaned out to Boavista for a season.

Gomes is eligible to represent England, Angola or Portugal at international level. He has made more than 40 appearances for England's youth national teams, from under-16 to under-21 level. He was the captain of the England under-17 team that won the 2017 FIFA U-17 World Cup.

Club career

Manchester United

Early years
Gomes started training with the Manchester United academy at the age of six. When he was 13, he represented the under-17s at a tournament in Slovakia in October 2013, and during the 2014–15 season, aged just 14, he was twice named on the bench for the under-18s before making his debut as a substitute against Middlesbrough in their final league match. In July 2015, Gomes captained the Manchester United under-15s at the Manchester United Premier Cup and was named Most Valuable Player, despite his team finishing in 12th place.

Gomes signed as an academy scholar ahead of the 2016–17 season, and on 27 August 2016, he became the youngest player to score a hat-trick for Manchester United at academy level since 2001, despite starting the game on the bench. After sustaining an injury in April 2017, Gomes was forced to miss the Dallas Cup. With 12 goals in 19 starts he was the under-18s' top scorer that season, and in May 2017 he was voted as the Jimmy Murphy Player of the Year, the youngest player ever to receive the award. The following day, he trained with the first team ahead of possible inclusion in the squad for the final Premier League game of the season.

First-team breakthrough
Gomes made his first-team debut on 21 May 2017, replacing Wayne Rooney in the 88th minute of a 2–0 home victory over Crystal Palace. At  old, he became the youngest player to represent Manchester United since Duncan Edwards in 1953, as well as the first player born in the 2000s to appear in the Premier League.

On 13 December 2017, Gomes signed his first professional contract with Manchester United, and on 26 January 2018, he made his FA Cup debut, coming on as an 88th-minute substitute for Marcus Rashford in a 4–0 victory against Yeovil Town in the Fourth Round.

On 25 July 2019, Gomes scored his first senior goal in a 2–1 pre-season friendly win against Tottenham Hotspur. However, he found first-team opportunities hard to come by during the 2019–20 season, playing just six times in all competitions. Despite protracted negotiations, Manchester United were unable to sign Gomes to a contract extension, and he was released on 30 June 2020.

Lille

2020–21 season: Loan to Boavista
On 4 August 2020, Gomes signed a five-year contract with French club Lille, and was immediately loaned out to Portuguese club Boavista for the 2020–21 campaign. On his league debut for Boavista, Gomes registered a hat-trick of assists and was awarded man of the match in a 3–3 draw against C.D. Nacional. In a match against Moreirense on 2 October 2020, Gomes scored his first goal for the club, a wonder strike from the halfway line. On 2 November, Gomes won a penalty and then converted the spot-kick in a 3–0 win against Benfica.

International career
In addition to his native England, Gomes is also eligible to represent Angola and Portugal.

Gomes began his international career in August 2015, when he made two appearances for England at under-16 level, both against the United States. He captained the under-16s on two occasions while making a further seven appearances.

He was called up to the England under-17 team in August 2016, and scored four minutes into his debut while captaining his nation to a 3–1 victory over Belgium. Gomes added another two goals and an assist in his second appearance; a 5–0 win over Croatia. In October, he scored again in an 8–1 win against Germany. Gomes also scored in qualification for the UEFA Under-17 Championship, but missed out on the tournament in May 2017 due to injury. Gomes scored the fourth goal in England's opening game of the 2017 FIFA U-17 World Cup, with an 81st-minute free-kick as they beat Chile 4–0. He ultimately captained the team to their first U-17 World Cup title. Gomes made 13 appearances and scored six goals in total at under-17 level.

He made his debut at under-18 level on 1 September 2017, when he captained England in a 0–0 draw with Brazil. Three days later, he made his second and final appearance for the under-18 team, in a 2–1 loss against South Africa.

Gomes scored one goal in six appearances for the England under-19 team. He scored in a 4–1 victory over the Netherlands in a friendly on 5 September 2018.

Gomes made his England under-20 debut during a 0–0 draw against the Netherlands on 5 September 2019. He made six appearances in total for the under-20 team and scored two goals.

On 1 October 2021, Gomes received his first call up for the England under-21 squad and made his debut as a substitute during a 1–0 2023 UEFA European Under-21 Championship qualification win away to Andorra on 11 October 2021. He has made 11 appearances so far at under-21 level.

Style of play
Gomes' preferred position is as an attacking midfielder. His playing style has been compared to that of Ronaldinho due to his creativity, composure and dribbling. In January 2015, Nani described Gomes as Manchester United's next star. Manchester United graduate Danny Webber said: "Gomes is still very small, but he sees the game seconds before others. Angel is like Paul Scholes; he can dictate a game with his intelligence."

Personal life
Gomes is the son of Angolan-born former Portugal under-21 international Gil Gomes, and was born in Edmonton, Greater London during his father's time at Hendon. The family moved to the Manchester area when Gil joined Middlewich Town, and settled in Salford, where Gomes grew up. Former Manchester United winger Nani is Gomes' godfather, and he has said that Nani's influence was "massive" as he was somebody he idolised as a youngster.

Career statistics

Honours
Lille
Trophée des Champions: 2021

England U17
FIFA U-17 World Cup: 2017

Individual
Manchester United Premier Cup Most Valuable Player: 2015
Jimmy Murphy Young Player of the Year: 2016–17

References

External links

 

2000 births
Living people
Footballers from Edmonton, London
English footballers
England youth international footballers
Association football midfielders
Manchester United F.C. players
Lille OSC players
Boavista F.C. players
Premier League players
Ligue 1 players
Primeira Liga players
England under-21 international footballers
Black British sportspeople
English people of Angolan descent
English people of Portuguese descent
English expatriate footballers
Expatriate footballers in France
Expatriate footballers in Portugal
English expatriate sportspeople in France
English expatriate sportspeople in Portugal